Heatherbrae is a suburb of the Port Stephens local government area in the Hunter Region of New South Wales, Australia. The suburb lies to the east of the Hunter River and to the south of the town of Raymond Terrace. It is bisected by the Pacific Highway. At the 2016 census it had a population of 512. Most of the population lives to the west of the Pacific Highway in a housing subdivision while some residents live to the east of the highway in a semi-industrial area. Remaining residents live in rural and semi-rural areas adjacent to the highway and throughout the rest of the suburb. The Worimi people are the traditional owners of the Port Stephens area. In 2016 the median age of the population was 54. 80% were born in Australia, 2.6% New Zealand, 2.2% Pakistan, 2.0% England, 1% Germany and 0.8% China. In terms of religion, 26.1% were Anglican, 21.4% No Religion, 19.0% Catholic, 12.0% Not Stated and 4.5% Uniting Church. In terms of languages spoken other than English, 2.2% speak Urdu, 0.8% Tagalog, 0.6% Italian, 0.6% Serbo-Croatian/Yugoslavian and 0.6% Bengali.

See also
 2013 New South Wales bushfires

Notes

References

Suburbs of Port Stephens Council